The R200 road is a regional road in County Leitrim and County Cavan, Ireland. Going from west to east, the route connects the towns of Drumkeeran, Dowra, Glangevlin and Derrynacreeve. En route it crosses the R207 at Dowra, is joined by the R206 at Glengavlen, passes through the Bellavally Gap before terminating in Derrynacreeve at the N87 national secondary route.

Official description

The official description of the R200 from the Roads Act 1993 (Classification of Regional Roads) Order 2006  reads (east to west):

Derrynacreeve County Cavan - Drumkeeran, County Leitrim

Between its junction with R202 at Derryvahan in the county of Cavan and its junction with R280 at Drumkeeran in the county of Leitrim via Bellavally, Glangevlin and Corratober in the county of Cavan: Kilmore in the county of Leitrim: Dowra Bridge at the boundary between the county of Leitrim and the county of Cavan: Dowra and Kilduff in the county of Cavan: and Kilmore in the county of Leitrim.

See also
National primary road
National secondary road
Roads in Ireland

References

Regional roads in the Republic of Ireland
Roads in County Leitrim

Roads in County Cavan